Axios (stylized as ΛXIOS) is an American news website based in Arlington, Virginia. It was founded in 2016 and launched the following year by former Politico journalists Jim VandeHei, Mike Allen, and Roy Schwartz.

Axioss articles are typically brief and matter-of-fact; most are shorter than 300 words and use bullet points, so they are easier to scan. In addition to news articles, Axios produces daily and weekly industry-specific newsletters (including Allen's Axios AM, a successor to his newsletter Politico Playbook for Politico), and two daily podcasts.

On September 1, 2022, Cox Enterprises completed its acquisition of Axios.

History 

VandeHei said he wanted Axios to be a "mix between The Economist and Twitter". The company initially covered a mix of business, politics, technology, health care, and media. VandeHei said Axios would focus on the "collision between tech and areas such as bureaucracy, healthcare, energy, and the transportation infrastructure". At launch, Nicholas Johnston, a former managing editor at Bloomberg L.P., was named editor-in-chief.

In the summer of 2016, Axios secured $10 million in a round of financing led by Lerer Hippeau Ventures. Backers include media-partner NBC News, Laurene Powell Jobs' Emerson Collective, Greycroft Partners, and David and Katherine Bradley, owners of Atlantic Media. The company had raised $30 million . It planned to focus on "business, technology, politics, and media trends". Axios generates revenue through short-form native advertising and sponsored newsletters. It earned more than $10 million in revenue in its first seven months. Its advertisers include Exxon Mobil and Koch Industries.

In January 2017, Axios hired as an executive vice president Evan Ryan, the Assistant Secretary of State for Educational and Cultural Affairs and a former staffer for Vice President Joe Biden. , the company said it had 60 employees with 40 working in editorial. Axios had 6 million visitors in September 2017, according to comScore. , Axios said it had 200,000 subscribers to 11 newsletters, with an average open rate of 52 percent. The same month, it said it would use a new $20 million investment to expand data analysis, product development, fund audience growth, and increase staff to 150, up from 89.

In March and April 2019, HuffPost and Wired reported that Axios had paid a firm to improve its reputation by lobbying for changes to the Wikipedia articles on Axios and Jonathan Swan.

In July 2020, Axios received $4.8 million in federal loans from the Paycheck Protection Program for salary replacement during the COVID-19 pandemic. It later returned the money, with VandeHei explaining that the loans had become "politically polarizing". In September 2020, The Wall Street Journal reported that Axios was on track to be profitable in 2020 "despite the economic turmoil stemming from the coronavirus that led to broad layoffs and pay cuts at many media outlets".

In May 2021, The Wall Street Journal reported that merger discussions between Axios and The Athletic had ended, with The Athletic opting to pursue a deal with The New York Times.

In January 2022, the company announced Axios Local, a project that aims to "bring smart, modern, trustworthy local news to every community in America" by providing a platform for local contributors, starting with a rollout in 14 locations and reaching 25 by mid-2022, all major U.S. cities.

On August 8, 2022, Axios announced that it had been sold to Cox Enterprises for $525 million. According to the deal, Cox owns 70 percent of the company, while Axios employees and its founders retain ownership of the remaining 30 percent. The acquisition was completed the next month.

In March 2023, Axios fired Ben Montgomery, a Pulitzer Prize finalist, after he described a press release about a Ron DeSantis event "exposing the diversity equity and inclusion scam in higher education" as "propaganda" in an email reply.

Content 

Axioss content is designed for digital platforms, such as Facebook and Snapchat, as well as its own website. Reporters have made appearances on television news on NBC News and MSNBC through a deal with NBC. Its NBC Universal partnership has featured co-founder Mike Allen on MSNBC's show Morning Joe. Content is distributed via newsletters covering politics, technology, healthcare, and other subjects. Among the newsletters is a daily report by Allen, who formerly wrote Politicos Playbook newsletter. Typical articles are shorter than 300 words.

In 2018 the literary magazine n+1s editors identified Axios as an example of a new style of writing that "is simultaneously careful and strident, low-key and declarative" to cater to impatient readers. They wrote, "Axios, whose name is a cross between a defense contractor and an aggressive men's deodorant, has dispensed with everything but theses and bullet points." According to a 2020 Knight Foundation study, Axios is generally read by a moderate audience, leaning slightly toward the left.

Axios on HBO 
A documentary series based on the website's reporting, also titled Axios (sometimes disambiguated as Axios on HBO), began airing on HBO in the United States and internationally on November 4, 2018. The program primarily features interviews with political and business figures in the news and is a co-production of Axios Media, HBO Documentary Films, and DCTV. Initially airing on Sunday evenings in blocks of four consecutive weeks once or twice a year, the program temporarily switched to year-round biweekly production, airing on Monday nights, in April 2020, before returning to its previous schedule in 2021. After 57 episodes, Axios on HBO ended permanently, with its final episode aired on December 12, 2021.

See also

 FiveThirtyEight
 RealClearPolitics

References

External links
 

2016 establishments in Virginia
American news websites
2022 mergers and acquisitions
Companies based in Arlington County, Virginia
Cox Enterprises
Internet properties established in 2017
Mass media companies established in 2016
Podcasting companies